Vladislav Yatskevich (born 29 September 1998) is a Belarusian professional footballer who plays for Slutsk.

References

External links 
 
 

1998 births
Living people
Belarusian footballers
Association football defenders
FC Smorgon players
FC Baranovichi players
FC Neman Grodno players
FC Slutsk players